Monthelie is a commune in the Côte-d'Or department in eastern France.

Population

Wine

Monthelie is one of the wine communes of the Côte de Beaune.

See also
Communes of the Côte-d'Or department

References

Communes of Côte-d'Or